Wyoming Highway 333 (WYO 333) was a Wyoming state highway known as Airport Road. WYO 333 served as a connector between Wyoming Highway 332 and the Sheridan County Airport. Mileposts for Route 333 increased from east to west as the route entered the airport.

Route description
WYO 333 traveled north from the Sheridan County Airport and turned due east before coming to its terminus with WYO 332 at a t-intersection.

Major intersections

References

External links 

Wyoming State Routes 300-399
Sheridan County Airport

Transportation in Sheridan County, Wyoming
333